A coach gun is a modern term, coined by gun collectors, for a double-barreled shotgun, generally with barrels from  in length, placed side-by-side.  These weapons were known as "cut-down shotguns" or "messenger's guns"  from the use of such shotguns on stagecoaches by shotgun messengers in the American Wild West. They came in 10 and 12 gauge blackpowder variants.

Origins
The terms "cut-down shotgun" or "messenger's gun" were coined in the 1860s when Wells Fargo & Co. assigned shotgun messengers to guard its shipments on stagecoaches in California.  The company issued shotguns to its  guards for defense. The guard was called a shotgun messenger although the phrase riding shotgun was not coined until 1919.  Shotgun messengers guarded express shipments, not stagecoaches.

Early manufacturers 
These shotguns featured external hammers and were manufactured primarily by Remington Arms, Ithaca, Colt's Manufacturing Company, Parker, L.C. Smith, and several Belgian makers.  Contrary to myth, Wells Fargo shotguns were not purchased by local agents; prior to 1900 they were purchased from San Francisco gun dealers because Wells Fargo's headquarters were located in San Francisco.  From 1908 to 1918 all Wells Fargo shotguns were made by Ithaca.

Use in the Old West 
According to one account, Doc Holliday used a 10 gauge Wm. Moore & Co. coach gun to shoot Tom McLaury point-blank in the chest with buckshot during the Gunfight at the OK Corral in Tombstone, Arizona, on Wednesday, October 26, 1881.  They stood in such close proximity that the town mortician was able to cover McLaury's wound with one hand.   Wyatt Earp also used both barrels of a 10 gauge coach gun to kill Frank Stilwell at a Tucson, Arizona rail yard and to kill "Curly" Bill Brocius point-blank the next year during the shootout at Iron Springs.  However, according to another account, both men used Greeners.

Modern makers 
Modern coach guns are manufactured by ER Amantino (sold as Stoeger) (Brazil), IZH/Baikal (Russia) (which is now being distributed by Remington under the name Spartan Gunworks), Huglu Armsco (Turkey), Khan (Turkey), Diamond (Turkey), and a variety of Chinese companies for US distribution through Century International Arms and Interstate Armscorp.

Current usage 
Modern coach guns are commonly encountered in Cowboy Action Shooting competitions, among collections of Western guns, as home-defense weapons, and even as "scrub guns" for hunting grouse, woodcock, rabbit, hare, and/or wild pig in scrub, bush or marshlands, where the 24"+ barrels of a traditional shotgun would prove unwieldy. The modern coach gun can be had in a variety of configurations suitable for both Cowboy Action Shooting competition and hunting.

Coach guns are similar to sawn-off shotguns but differ in that coach guns manufactured after 1898 are offered as new with 18" barrels and 26" overall length and meet legal requirements for civilian possession in the United States. Australia and New Zealand have slightly different laws for length, with NZ requiring a minimum overall length of 30" (anything shorter is considered a pistol) with no minimum barrel length and Australia requiring an 18" barrel and a 30" overall length. In the United Kingdom, however, shotguns must have a minimum barrel length of 24" to be eligible for ownership on a Shotgun Certificate, and shotguns with barrels under this length (which includes Coach guns) must be obtained on the more stringent Firearms Certificate.  Some modern coach guns feature internal hammers as opposed to the traditional external hammers.

Legacy 
It is because of this gun and its usage that the term "riding shotgun" came to be. Typically, a cut-down shotgun would be carried by the messenger sitting next to the stagecoach driver, ready to use the gun to ward off bandits.  Today, in American and Canadian English, the term "riding shotgun" refers to the person sitting in the front passenger seat of an automobile.

See also
Blunderbuss
Lupara
Stagecoaching

References

Further reading

Break-action shotguns
Guns of the American West
American Civil War weapons